Lowes Island is a census-designated place (CDP) in Loudoun County, Virginia, United States. The population as of the 2010 United States Census was 10,756. Along with nearby Countryside and Cascades, it is considered one of the three main components of the Potomac Falls community (ZIP code 20165).

The community takes its name from an island on the south shore of the Potomac River, now home to the Trump National Golf Club Washington, D.C., owned by Donald Trump. The club was formerly the Lowes Island Club; Trump purchased it in 2009. Located on the site is the "River of Blood" monument erected by Trump, which celebrates an American Civil War battle that never happened.

Geography
Lowes Island is in the eastern corner of Loudoun County and is bordered to the east by Fairfax County, Virginia, and to the north, across the Potomac, by Montgomery County, Maryland. Neighboring communities are Great Falls to the east, Sugarland Run to the south, Cascades to the west, and Darnestown, Maryland, to the northeast.

Sugarland Run forms the western border of the CDP, flowing north to the Potomac River at the physical Lowes Island.

References

Census-designated places in Loudoun County, Virginia
Washington metropolitan area
Census-designated places in Virginia